Gustavo S. Oderich is a Brazilian American vascular and endovascular surgeon who serves as a professor and chief of vascular and endovascular surgery, and is the director of the Advanced Endovascular Aortic Program at McGovern Medical School at The University of Texas Health Science Center at Houston and Memorial Hermann Health System. He previously served as chair of vascular and endovascular division at the Mayo Clinic in Rochester, Minnesota. Oderich is recognized for his work in minimally invasive endovascular surgery and research in fenestrated and branched stent-graft technology to treat complex aortic aneurysms and dissections.

Education 
Originally from Brazil, Oderich received his medical degree, followed by a surgical residency at the Universidade Federal do Rio Grande do Sul in 1990 to 1997 in Porto Alegre, Brazil.  He completed a vascular surgery research fellowship at the University of Utah in 1998, then continued his clinical residency training in general surgery at the Mayo Clinic from 1999 to 2004. Upon completing his residency program, he trained in a vascular surgery fellowship, also at the Mayo Clinic from 2005 to 2006, followed by an extended fellowship in advanced endovascular repair at the Cleveland Clinic Foundation in 2007.

Early career 
Oderich focuses on the open surgical, clinical evaluation and endovascular treatment of dissections, trauma,  aneurysms and aortic pathology involving any segment of the aorta. He chairs the Society for Vascular Surgery Reporting Standards on endovascular repair of complex aneurysms, which oversees several research trials. From 2007 to 2020, Oderich served as the immediate past Chair of the Vascular and Endovascular Surgery at the Mayo Clinic and was director of the Mayo Clinic Aortic Center program. The center developed research in endovascular repair of dissections and aortic aneurysms using such devices, with a significant reduction in mortality and morbidity compared to results of open surgical repair. In July, 2020, he joined The University of Texas Health Science Center, Houston.

Research 
Oderich serves as the global principal investigator for the Thoraco Plus trials, Cook Group Zenith Plus, and Chairs the Society for Vascular Surgery Reporting Standards. He is a nominated surgeons in the US, to have physician sponsored, Federal Drug Administration (FDA) approved access for manufacturing branched stent-grafts and Cook fenestrated to treat thoracoabdominal, aortic arch, and complex abdominal aortic aneurysms. Oderich is also specialized and involved in the sponsored device trials including the Gore TAMBE (ThoracoAbdominal Multi-Branch Endoprosthesis). Oderich also provided his research and expertise in the initial development of physician-modified endovascular grafts (PMEGs). Oderich is also the editor of the “Endovascular Aortic Repair: Current Techniques of fenestrated, branched and parallel grafts". Oderich serves as an Associate Editor of the Annals of Vascular Surgery and of the Journal of Cardiovascular Surgery. He is an ad hoc member or full member of the Editorial Board of 62 surgical and medical journals. Dr. Oderich has given over 690 Lectures and has also lectured as Invited Professor in 30 academic institutions including Harvard, UCLA, Stanford, McGill University (Montreal, Quebec Canada), Federal Drug Administration, University of Bologna (Bologna, Italy), Guys Hospital (London, UK), King's College and Nuremberg (Nuremberg, Germany), the Universities of Paris, (Paris, France) and Munich (Munich, Germany).

Honors and awards 
 First Place Karmody Poster Competition, Society for Clinical Vascular Surgery (2017)
 Magna Cum Laude Award for Digital Poster, RSNA (2015)

Selected publications

References 

Physicians from Texas
American vascular surgeons
Living people
Year of birth missing (living people)
Federal University of Rio Grande do Sul alumni
American medical academics
American medical researchers
Brazilian emigrants to the United States